Vitaliy Olehovych Samoylov (born 1 March 1975 in Kiev) is a former Ukrainian football player.

Honours
Dynamo Kyiv
Ukrainian Premier League champion: 1996–97
Ukrainian Cup winner: 1997–98

Vorskla Poltava
Ukrainian Premier League bronze: 1996–97

References

1975 births
Footballers from Kyiv
Living people
Ukrainian footballers
FC Dynamo-3 Kyiv players
FC Dynamo-2 Kyiv players
FC Vorskla Poltava players
Ukrainian Premier League players
FC Dynamo Kyiv players
FC Baltika Kaliningrad players
Ukrainian expatriate footballers
Expatriate footballers in Russia
FC Sokol Saratov players
Russian Premier League players
FC Obolon-Brovar Kyiv players
FC Rotor Volgograd players
Association football midfielders
Ukrainian expatriate sportspeople in Russia